Petropavlovka is a rural locality (a selo) in Zaigrayevsky District, Republic of Buryatia, Russia. The population was 65 as of 2010.

Geography 
Petropavlovka is located 36 km northeast of Zaigrayevo (the district's administrative centre) by road. Novaya Kurba is the nearest rural locality.

References 

Rural localities in Zaigrayevsky District